No Hiding from the Blackbird is the second split EP with Nurse with Wound, released in 1984. The full title is No Hiding from the Blackbird / The Burial of the Stoned Sardine.

Pressings
First pressing (1984)
Second pressing (1990)

Track listing
"No Hiding from the Blackbird"
"The Burial of the Stoned Sardine"

References
Brainwashed.com

1984 albums
Current 93 albums